Mendocino Pass is a mountain pass located in the Northern Coast Ranges in California. One of them is US Forest Highway 7, a dirt road connecting two disjointed sections of State Route 162. The pass and dirt roads are closed in winter due to heavy snowfall.

References

Landforms of Glenn County, California
Mountain passes of California
Transportation in Glenn County, California